The World Polonia Games are a multi-sport event held annually for the Polish diaspora (Polonia) and Polish minorities living outside of Poland. Held annually and alternating between summer and winter games each year, the games bring in 1000 participants from around 25 to 30 countries worldwide.

The first World Polonia Games were held in 1934 in Warsaw, with 381 athletes from 13 countries. Following a four decade break, the games were revived in 1974 in Kraków and have been held more regularly since. Seventeen different host cities throughout Poland have hosted an installation of the event. Today, the games are organized by the Association "Polish Community" and are covered by TVP Polonia.

The XV Winter World Polonia Games, its most recent installation, were held in February 2022 in Wisła, Silesian Voivodeship.

History

Background and the first games 

As early as the turn of the century around 1900, during the period of the third partition of Poland, Polish athletes travelled to participate on sports competitions. For example, the "Meeting of the Polish Falconers' Union" (Zlot Sokolstwa Polskiego), which took place in Krakow in 1910 on the occasion of the 500th anniversary of the Battle of Tannenberg, in which around 10,000 Poles from Europe and the United States took part in. Sports and athleticism was developed in Poland in the 1930s, during the time of the independent Second Polish Republic, with the nation participating in the Olympic Games. The growing enthusiasm for sports led to the establishment of numerous Polish sports clubs in the diaspora.

At a "Congress of the Organizing Council of Poles Abroad” in Warsaw in 1933, the "First Polonia Sports Games" (I. Polonijne Igrzyska Sportowe, PIS) were organized for Poles living outside of Poland (including those from the Free City of Danzig). Its organizing committee was headed by the Marshal of the Senate Władysław Raczkiewicz. The firsrt games were held in 1934 in Warsaw, and 400 athletes took part from 13 nations worldwide. The opening ceremony on August 1, 1934, in Warsaw's Stadion Wojska Polskiego was attended by the President of Poland Ignacy Mościcki. The largest team was made up of Poles from the Free City of Danzig with 64 competitors, with the most successful teams being those from France, Danzig, and Czechoslovakia.

The modern games

The Second World War and post-war tension resulted in a four decade break in the games until its revival in 1974 in Kraków. Even then, authorities initially prevented the participation of Poles from the Soviet Union and its successor states until the nation's collapse in 1991. In 1986, the first winter World Polonia Games took place in Zakopane for the first time. They were originally held every three years from 1986 to 1992, but have now been held every two years since 2000 after an eight-year break.

In 1990, the association "Polish Community" (Stowarzyszenie "Wspólnota Polska") was founded in Warsaw, which organizes the World Games to this day. The aim of the association is to strengthen ties among Poles living abroad. The association's longtime chairman, the politician Andrzej Stelmachowski, campaigned for a revival of the Games in the 1990s. At the 1991 Summer Games, participants had the opportunity to meet Pope John Paul II, who was present at the event.

Since 1997, the main media patron and co-organizer of the games has been TVP Polonia. The games have been held annually, with the event alternating between summer and winter games each year, since 1999; Summer Games are held in odd-numbered years and Winter Games in even-numbered years. Games hosts vary, while the regular hosts of the Winter Games have been the Beskids (6 times; consisting of the cities of Bielsko Biała, Cieszyn, Szczyrk, Tychy, and Wisła together) and Zakopane (5 times). In 2018, the Winter Games were brought to Krynica-Zdrój for the first time.

The games have continued throughout the COVID-19 pandemic and the 2022 Ukrainian refugee crisis, although to a reduced extent and with increased health and safety precautions in place.

Sports

Summer sports
In addition to a children's and family tournament, the Summer Games have consisted of:
Source:

Winter sports
In addition to a children's and family tournament, the Winter Games have consisted of:
Source:

Participating nations 
The games are open to any Polish person or person of Polish descent who does not permanently live in Poland. Participating nations at the World Polonia Games have included those listed in the table below. Numbers indicate the number of times nations have topped a games medal table.

Source:

Notable people

Participants
 Andżelika Borys (Belarus: 2011), Polish-Belarusian activist and president of the Union of Poles in Belarus
 Irène Debrunner (Switzerland: 1974), Swiss freestyle swimmer and Olympic athlete
 Stanisława Walasiewicz (United States: 1934, 1977), Polish-American track and field athlete and Olympic champion
 Bożena Wojciekian (Canada: 2011), Polish-Canadian shot putter

Attendees
 Bogdan Borusewicz (opened the 2011 Summer Games), Marshal of the Polish Senate
 Anna Gębala-Duraj (torchbearer and guest at the 2006 Winter Games), Polish cross-country skier and Olympic athlete
 Wiesław Gębala (torchbearer and guest at the 2006 Winter Games), Polish cross-country skier and Olympic athlete
 Pope John Paul II (guest at the 1991 Summer Games)
 Grzegorz Lato (guest at the 2011 Summer Games), Polish footballer and president of the Polish Football Association
 Lech Kaczyński (opened the 2010 Winter Games), President of Poland
 Longin Pastusiak (opened the 2004 Winter Games), Speaker of the Polish Senate
 Maciej Płażyński (opened the 2006 Winter Games), Deputy Speaker of the Polish Senate
Additional guests at the 2011 Summer Games opening ceremony in Wrocław included Jacek Bocian, Jan Brzeźny, Piotr Rysiukiewicz, Ryszard Szurkowski, and Urszula Włodarczyk. Numerous Polish Olympians were also present during the 2011 Summer Games, including Halina Aszkiełowicz-Wojno, Włodzimierz Chlebosz, Mariusz Jędra, Mieczysław Łopatka, Ryszard Podlas, and Leszek Swornowski.

List of World Polonia Games

Summer Games 

Source:

Winter Games 

Source:

Host cities

Number of occurrences

  Małopolskie – 11 times (5 Summer; 6 Winter)
  Śląskie – 7 times (7 Winter)
  Masowieckie – 4 times (3 Summer; 1 Winter)
  Dolnośląskie – 3 times (2 Summer; 1 Winter)
  Pomorskie – 3 times (3 Summer)
  Kujawsko-Pomorskie – 2 times (2 Summer)
  Lubelskie – 2 times (2 Summer)
  Podkarpackie – 1 time (1 Winter)
   Świętokrzyskie – 1 time (1 Summer)
  Wielkopolskie – 1 time (1 Summer)

Medal tables

Medal leaders by year 
Summer World Polonia Games medal table leaders by year

 1934: 
 1974: 
 1977: 
 1981: 
 1984: 
 1987: 
 1991: 
 1997: 
 1999: 
 2001: 
 2003: 
 2005: 
 2007: 
 2009: 
 2011: 
 2013: 
 2015: 
 2017: 
 2019: 
 2021: 

Winter World Polonia Games medal table leaders by year

 1986: n/a
 1989: n/a
 1992: n/a
 2000: 
 2002: 
 2004: 
 2006: 
 2008: 
 2010: 
 2012: 
 2014: 
 2016: 
 2018: 
 2020: n/a
 2022: 

Number of occurrences

  – 11 times (4 Summer; 7 Winter)
  – 6 times (6 Summer)
  – 4 times (4 Summer)
  – 4 times (4 Summer)
  – 3 times (3 Winter)
  – 1 time (1 Winter)
  – 1 time (1 Summer)
  – 1 time (1 Summer)

See also 
 List of World Polonia Games records
 Polish diaspora (Polonia)

Notes

References

External links 
 Wspólnota Polska (Association "Polish Community")
 Official webpage of the 2017 games
 Official webpage of the 2019 games
 Official webpage of the 2021 games
 Official webpage of Team Canada
Timeline of the Summer World Polonia Games (1934–2015)
Timeline of the World Polonia Winter Games (1986–2016)

Polish diaspora
Sport in Poland